Bradford Moor is an electoral ward within the City of Bradford Metropolitan District Council.  The population of the ward at the 2011 Census was 21,210.
The ward includes the areas of Laisterdyke and Thornbury.

History 
Bradford Moor Barracks were located at the corner of Leeds Old Road and Killinghall Road.

Geography 

The ward covers the areas of Bradford known as Bradford Moor, Laisterdyke and Thornbury.  It is bordered on the west by Barkerend and the south by Bowling (both part of the same ward); on the north side is Eccleshill ward and on the east is the Pudsey area of Leeds.  The direct route between the centres of Bradford and Leeds passes through the middle of the ward as Leeds Old Road (B6381).

Bradford Moor was originally a moor, as the name suggests. Despite being near the centre of Bradford, it was urbanised relatively late in the city's history, but is now inner-city in character.

Councillors 
The ward is represented on Bradford Council by two Labour Party councillors, Mohammed Shafiq and Zafar Iqbal, and one Liberal Democrat councillor, Riaz Ahmed.

 indicates seat up for re-election.
 indicates councillor defection.

See also
Listed buildings in Bradford (Bradford Moor Ward)

References

External links 
 BCSP (Internet Explorer only)
 BBC election results
 Council ward profile (PDF)

Wards of Bradford
Areas of Bradford